Nammijärvi is a medium-sized lake in the Paatsjoki main catchment area. It is located in the region Lapland in Finland. The whole lake is situated in Vätsäri Wilderness Area.

See also
List of lakes in Finland

References

Lakes of Inari, Finland